The Pashi are a tribe of Hazara people in Afghanistan they mainly inhabit in Jaghori and Malistan districts. Some of the clans a part of the Pashi are Chihilbaghtoie Pashi, Jaka-Pashi, Qabjoi, Pai Julga, Shab Bakhair, Bopal, Nawe-Pashi, Payik, Ulyad, Dadi, Zingar.

See also

List of Hazara tribes

References

Hazara people
Hazara tribes